Juila King may refer to:

 Julia King, Baroness Brown of Cambridge (born 1954)
 Julia King (Australian businesswoman)
 Julia King (field hockey) (born 1992)